Graham Gartland (born 13 July 1983) is an Irish football coach and former player. He played for Drogheda United, Shamrock Rovers, Home Farm, Barnsley, Dundee United, St Patrick's Athletic, Longford Town and St Johnstone. Gartland also played for the Republic of Ireland B national football team.

Playing career
Gartland scored a goal for Drogheda in a UEFA Cup tie against HJK Helsinki in August 2006. In the next round against IK Start Gartland became the first player in UEFA Cup history to miss two penalties in a shoot out as Drogheda were eliminated.

He then had a good UEFA Champions League run with Drogheda in 2008. He scored the winner against FC Levadia Tallinn in the second leg of the first round tie. He also scored a late equaliser against Dynamo Kiev in the second round tie. His form attracted the interest of Ipswich Town, but Drogheda rejected a bid of £250,000.

Gartland signed for St Johnstone under freedom of contract in December 2008. Almost immediately after joining, Gartland suffered an injury to his cruciate ligament which would go on to keep him out the game for six weeks. Graham continued to help his old club Drogheda United with fundraising after the club entered examinership.

Almost exactly a month after signing, Gartland made his competitive debut for the Perth club in an away fixture against Greenock Morton. As part of a new look three-man defence, Gartland helped Saints keep a clean sheet as they drew 0–0. He made seven league appearances for Saints as they won promotion to the Scottish Premier League by winning the First Division. Gartland was released from his contract with St Johnstone by mutual consent in January 2012. He had not played for the club in the 2011–12 season, after recovering from a long-term injury.

On 13 January 2012, Gartland signed for his home town club. On 24 January 2013, Garland signed for Shelbourne FC.

International career
Graham represented Republic of Ireland at every age level up to and including under-21. He played for the Republic of Ireland U16 in the qualifiers for the 2000 UEFA European Under-16 Football Championship, and has also played at B international level.

Coaching career
Gartland assisted Neil McCann at Scottish Premiership club Dundee until they were both sacked by the club in October 2018.

Honours 
Longford Town
 FAI Cup (2): 2003, 2004
 League of Ireland Cup (1): 2004

Drogheda United
 League of Ireland (1): 2007
 FAI Cup (1): 2005
 Setanta Sports Cup (2): 2006, 2007

St Johnstone
 Scottish First Division (1): 2008-09

References

External links

1983 births
Barnsley F.C. players
Dundee United F.C. players
Expatriate footballers in England
Expatriate footballers in Scotland
League of Ireland players
Association football defenders
Home Farm F.C. players
Living people
St Patrick's Athletic F.C. players
Longford Town F.C. players
Drogheda United F.C. players
Sportspeople from South Dublin (county)
Republic of Ireland association footballers
Republic of Ireland B international footballers
Republic of Ireland expatriate association footballers
Republic of Ireland under-21 international footballers
Republic of Ireland youth international footballers
Scottish Football League players
Scottish Premier League players
St Johnstone F.C. players
Ross County F.C. players
Shamrock Rovers F.C. players
Stella Maris F.C. players
Dundee F.C. non-playing staff